The Jacobite rising of 1745, also known as the Forty-five Rebellion or simply the '45, was an attempt by Charles Edward Stuart to regain the British throne for his father, James Francis Edward Stuart. It took place during the War of the Austrian Succession, when the bulk of the British Army was fighting in mainland Europe, and proved to be the last in a series of revolts that began in 1689, with major outbreaks in 1708, 1715 and 1719.

Charles launched the rebellion on 19 August 1745 at Glenfinnan in the Scottish Highlands, capturing Edinburgh and winning the Battle of Prestonpans in September. At a council in October, the Scots agreed to invade England after Charles assured them of substantial support from English Jacobites and a simultaneous French landing in Southern England. On that basis, the Jacobite army entered England in early November, reaching Derby on 4 December, where they decided to turn back.

Similar discussions had taken place at Carlisle, Preston and Manchester and many felt they had gone too far already. The invasion route had been selected to cross areas considered strongly Jacobite but the promised English support failed to materialise; they were outnumbered and in danger of having their retreat cut off. The decision was supported by the vast majority, but caused an irretrievable split between Charles and his Scots supporters. Despite victory at Falkirk Muir in January 1746, the Battle of Culloden in April ended the Rebellion and significant backing for the Stuart cause. Charles escaped to France, but was unable to win support for another attempt, and died in Rome in 1788.

Background

The 1688 Glorious Revolution replaced James II with his Protestant daughter Mary and her Dutch husband William, who ruled as joint monarchs of England, Ireland and Scotland. Neither Mary, who died in 1694, nor her sister Anne, had surviving children, which left their Catholic half-brother James Francis Edward as the closest natural heir. The 1701 Act of Settlement excluded Catholics from the succession and when Anne became queen in 1702, her heir was the distantly related but Protestant Electress Sophia of Hanover. Sophia died in June 1714 and when Anne followed two months later in August, Sophia's son succeeded as George I.

Louis XIV of France, the primary source of support for the exiled Stuarts, died in 1715 and his successors needed peace with Britain in order to rebuild their economy. The 1716 Anglo-French alliance forced James to leave France; he settled in Rome on a Papal pension, making him even less attractive to the Protestants who formed the vast majority of his British support. Jacobite rebellions in 1715 and 1719 both failed, the latter so badly its planners concluded that it might "ruin the King's Interest and faithful subjects in these parts". Senior exiles like Bolingbroke accepted pardons and returned home or took employment elsewhere. The birth of his sons Charles and Henry helped maintain public interest in the Stuarts, but by 1737, James was "living tranquilly in Rome, having abandoned all hope of a restoration".

At the same time, by the late 1730s French statesmen viewed the post-1713 expansion in British trade as a threat to the European balance of power and the Stuarts became one of a number of potential options for reducing it. However, a low-level insurgency was far more cost-effective than an expensive restoration, especially since they were unlikely to be any more pro-French than the Hanoverians.{{efn|Summarised in a British intelligence report of 1755; "...'tis not in the interest of France that the House of Stuart should ever be restored, as it would only unite the three Kingdoms against Them; England would have no exterior [threat] to mind, and [...] prevent any of its Descendants (the Stuarts) attempting anything against the Libertys or Religion of the People.}} The Scottish Highlands was an ideal location, due to the feudal nature of clan society, their remoteness and terrain; but as many Scots recognised, an uprising would also be devastating for the local populace.

Opposition to taxes levied by the government in London led to the 1725 malt tax and 1737 Porteous riots. In March 1743, the Highland-recruited 42nd Regiment of Foot was posted to Flanders, contrary to an understanding that their service was restricted to Scotland and led to a short-lived mutiny. However, mutinies over pay and conditions were not unusual and the worst riots in 1725 took place in Glasgow, a town Charles noted in 1746 as one 'where I have no friends and who are not at pains to hide it.'

Trade disputes between Spain and Britain led to the 1739 War of Jenkins' Ear, followed in 1740–41 by the War of the Austrian Succession. The long-serving British prime minister Robert Walpole was forced to resign in February 1742 by an alliance of Tories and anti-Walpole Patriot Whigs, who then excluded their partners from government. Furious Tories like the Duke of Beaufort asked for French help in restoring James to the British throne. While war with Britain was clearly only a matter of time, Cardinal Fleury, chief minister since 1723, viewed the Jacobites as unreliable fantasists, an opinion shared by most French ministers. An exception was the Marquis D'Argenson, who was appointed Foreign Minister by Louis XV after Fleury died in January 1743.

Post-1715; Jacobitism in the British Isles

Although Jacobitism remained a significant political movement in 1745, its internal divisions became increasingly apparent during the Rising; historian Frank McLynn identifies seven primary drivers, with Stuart loyalism the least important. Charles himself had little knowledge of the kingdoms he hoped to regain, while many of his senior advisors were Irish exiles, who wanted an autonomous, Catholic Ireland and the return of lands confiscated after the Irish Confederate Wars. His grandfather James II had promised these concessions in return for Irish support in the 1689 to 1691 Williamite War in Ireland, and only a Stuart on the throne of Great Britain could ensure their fulfillment. 

Such concessions were firmly opposed by Protestants who were the overwhelming majority in England, Wales and Scotland, while estimates of English support in particular confused indifference to the Hanoverians with enthusiasm for the Stuarts. After 1720, Robert Walpole tried to bind English Catholics closer to the regime by refusing to enforce laws against them. Many became government supporters, including the Duke of Norfolk, unofficial head of the English Catholic community. Sentenced to death in 1716, he was reprieved and remained in London during the 1745 rebellion, visiting George II to confirm his loyalty. 

Most English Jacobite sympathisers were Tories who resented their exclusion from power since 1714, and viewed Hanover as a liability which involved them in expensive Continental wars of minimal benefit to Britain. These sentiments were particularly strong in the City of London, although diplomats observed opposition to foreign entanglements was true "only so long as English commerce does not suffer". However, even this group was far more concerned to ensure the primacy of the Church of England, which meant defending it from Charles and his Catholic advisors, the Scots Presbyterians who formed the bulk of his army, or Nonconformists in general; many "Jacobite" demonstrations in Wales stemmed from hostility to the 18th century Welsh Methodist revival. 

The most prominent Welsh Jacobite was Denbighshire landowner and Tory Member of Parliament, Sir Watkin Williams-Wynn, head of the Jacobite White Rose society. He met with Stuart agents several times between 1740 and 1744 and promised support "if the Prince brought a French army"; in the end, he spent the Rebellion in London, with participation by the Welsh gentry limited to two lawyers, David Morgan and William Vaughan.

After the Jacobite rising of 1719, new laws imposed penalties on nonjuring clergy, those who refused to swear allegiance to the Hanoverian regime, rather than the Stuarts. For most English Non-Jurists, the issue was whether it was permissible to swear allegiance twice and so the problem naturally diminished as these priests died. In Scotland, doctrinal differences with the majority Church of Scotland meant they preserved their independence, which continues today in the Scottish Episcopal Church; many of those who participated in the Rising came from non-juring Episcopalian congregations. However, the most powerful single driver for Scottish support in 1745 was opposition to the 1707 Union, whose loss of political control was not matched by perceived economic benefit. This was particularly marked in Edinburgh, former location of the Scottish Parliament, and the Highlands.

In summary, Charles wanted to reclaim the throne of a united Great Britain and rule on the principles of the divine right of kings and absolutism, ideas rejected by the 1688 Glorious Revolution but which were reinforced by his trusted advisors, most of whom were long-term English or Irish Catholic exiles. They differed sharply from the Scottish Protestant nationalists who formed the bulk of the Jacobite army in 1745, and opposed the Union, Catholicism and "arbitrary" rule. At the same time, Jacobite exiles failed to appreciate the extent to which Tory support derived from policy differences with the Whigs, not Stuart loyalism.

Charles in Scotland

Under the 1743 Treaty of Fontainebleau, or Pacte de Famille, Louis XV and his uncle, Philip V of Spain, agreed to co-operate in taking a number of measures against Britain, including an attempted restoration of the Stuarts. In November 1743, Louis advised James the invasion was planned for February 1744 and began assembling 12,000 troops and transports at Dunkirk, selected because it was possible to reach the Thames from there in a single tide. Since the Royal Navy was well aware of this, the French squadron in Brest made ostentatious preparations for putting to sea, in hopes of luring their patrols away.

James remained in Rome while Charles made his way in secret to join the invasion force, but when Admiral Roquefeuil's squadron left Brest on 26 January 1744, the Royal Navy refused to follow. Naval operations against Britain often took place in the winter, when wind and tides made it harder for the British to enforce a blockade due to the increased risks of winter storms. As in 1719, the weather proved the British government's best defence; storms sank a number of French ships and severely damaged many others, Roquefeuil himself being among the casualties. In March, Louis cancelled the invasion and declared war on Britain.

In August, Charles travelled to Paris to argue for an alternative landing in Scotland: John Gordon of Glenbucket had proposed a similar plan in 1738, when it had been rejected by the French, and James himself. Charles met Sir John Murray of Broughton, liaison between the Stuarts and their Scottish supporters, who claimed he advised against it but Charles was "determined to come [...] though with a single footman". When Murray returned with this news, the Scots reiterated their opposition to a rising without substantial French backing, but Charles gambled that the French would have to support him, should he make the attempt.

He spent the first months of 1745 purchasing weapons, while victory at Fontenoy in April encouraged the French authorities to provide him with two transport ships. These were the 16-gun privateer Du Teillay and Elizabeth, an elderly 64-gun warship captured from the British in 1704, which carried the weapons and 100 volunteers from the French Army's Irish Brigade. In early July, Charles boarded Du Teillay at Saint-Nazaire accompanied by the "Seven Men of Moidart", the most notable being John O'Sullivan, an Irish exile and former French officer who acted as chief of staff. The two vessels left for the Outer Hebrides on 15 July but were intercepted four days out by HMS Lion, which engaged Elizabeth. After a four-hour battle, both were forced to return to port; losing the Elizabeth and its volunteers and weapons was a major setback, but Du Teillay landed Charles at Eriskay on 23 July.

Many of those contacted advised him to return to France, including MacDonald of Sleat and Norman MacLeod. Aware of the potential impact of defeat, they felt that by arriving without French military support, Charles had failed to keep his commitments and were unconvinced by his personal qualities. It is also suggested Sleat and Macleod were especially vulnerable to government sanctions due to their involvement in illegally selling tenants into indentured servitude. Enough were persuaded but the choice was rarely simple; Donald Cameron of Lochiel committed himself only after Charles provided "security for the full value of his estate should the rising prove abortive," while MacLeod and Sleat helped him escape after Culloden.

On 19 August, the rebellion was launched with the raising of the Royal Standard at Glenfinnan, witnessed by a force of Highlanders O'Sullivan estimated as around 700. The Jacobites marched on Edinburgh, reaching Perth on 4 September where they were joined by more sympathisers, including Lord George Murray. Previously pardoned for his participation in the 1715 and 1719 risings, Murray took over from O'Sullivan due to his better understanding of Highland military customs and the Jacobites spent the next week re-organising their forces.

The government in London, in order to divert as few troops as possible from the war effort in Europe, had decided to use auxiliary forces to suppress the rebellion. They asked the Dutch Republic to fulfil their part of Barrier Treaty and make the garrison troops of Tournai and Oudenarde available for the defence of Britain. The Dutch were able to comply with this request despite the raging war in Flanders, because Tournai had fallen on 9 June. The commander of the remaining 5,300 Dutch troops had had to sign a treaty stating that the soldiers from the garrison would not fight against France for the next 18 months. They could be loaned out by the Dutch Republic at no great loss as they would otherwise be useless. End september 6,000 Dutch troops under the Count of Nassau had arrived in England. They, however, saw little action and returned the next year in May.

The senior government legal officer in Scotland, Lord President Duncan Forbes, forwarded confirmation of the landing to London on 9 August. Many of the 3,000 soldiers available to Sir John Cope, the government commander in Scotland, were untrained recruits, and while he lacked information on Jacobite intentions, they were well-informed on his, as Murray had been one of his advisors. Forbes instead relied on his relationships to keep people loyal; he failed with Lochiel and Lord Lovat but succeeded with many others, including the Earl of Sutherland, Clan Munro and Lord Fortrose.

On 17 September, Charles entered Edinburgh unopposed, although Edinburgh Castle itself remained in government hands; James was proclaimed King of Scotland the next day and Charles his Regent. On 21 September, the Jacobites intercepted and scattered Cope's army in less than 20 minutes at the Battle of Prestonpans, just outside Edinburgh. The Duke of Cumberland, commander of the British army in Flanders, was recalled to London, along with 12,000 troops. To consolidate his support in Scotland, Charles published two "Declarations" on 9 and 10 October: the first dissolved the "pretended Union", the second rejected the Act of Settlement. He also instructed the 'Caledonian Mercury' to publish minutes of the 1695 Parliamentary enquiry into the Glencoe Massacre, often used as an example of post-1688 oppression.

Jacobite morale was further boosted in mid-October when the French landed supplies of money and weapons, together with an envoy, the Marquis d’Éguilles, which seemed to validate claims of French backing. However, Lord Elcho later claimed his fellow Scots were already concerned by Charles' autocratic style and fears he was overly influenced by his Irish advisors. A "Prince's Council" of 15 to 20 senior leaders was established; Charles resented it as an imposition by the Scots on their divinely appointed monarch, while the daily meetings accentuated divisions between the factions.

These internal tensions were highlighted by the meetings held on 30 and 31 October to discuss strategy. Most of the Scots wanted to consolidate their position and revive the pre-1707 Parliament of Scotland to help defend it against the "English armies" they expected to be sent against them. Charles argued an invasion of England was critical for attracting French support, and ensuring an independent Scotland by removing the Hanoverians. He was supported by the Irish exiles, for whom a Stuart on the British throne was the only way to achieve an autonomous, Catholic Ireland. Charles also claimed he was in contact with English supporters, who were simply waiting for their arrival, while d’Éguilles assured the council a French landing in England was imminent.

Despite their doubts, the Council agreed to the invasion, on condition the promised English and French support was forthcoming. Previous Scottish incursions into England had crossed the border at Berwick-upon-Tweed, but Murray selected a route via Carlisle and the North-West of England, areas strongly Jacobite in 1715. The last elements of the Jacobite army left Edinburgh on 4 November and government forces under General Handasyde retook the city on 14th.

Invasion of England

Murray divided the army into two columns to conceal their destination from General George Wade, government commander in Newcastle, and entered England on 8 November unopposed. On 10th, they reached Carlisle, an important border fortress before the 1707 Union but whose defences were now in poor condition, held by a garrison of 80 elderly veterans. However, without siege artillery the Jacobites would still have to starve it into submission, an operation for which they had neither the equipment or time. Despite this, the castle capitulated on 15 November, after learning Wade's relief force was delayed by snow. This success reinvigorated the Jacobite cause and when he retook the town in December, Cumberland wanted to execute those responsible.

Leaving a small garrison, the Jacobites continued south to Preston on 26 November, then Manchester on 28th. Here they received the first notable intake of English recruits, which were formed into the Manchester Regiment. Their commander was Francis Towneley, a Lancashire Catholic and former French Royal Army officer, whose elder brother Richard had narrowly escaped execution for his part in the 1715 Rising. At previous Council meetings in Preston and Manchester, many Scots felt they had already gone far enough, but agreed to continue when Charles assured them Sir Watkin Williams Wynn would meet them at Derby, while the Duke of Beaufort was preparing to seize the strategic port of Bristol. 

When they reached Derby on 4 December, there was no sign of these reinforcements or any other French landing in England and the Council convened on 5th to discuss next steps. Despite the large crowds that turned out to see them on the march south, only Manchester provided a significant number of recruits; Preston, a Jacobite stronghold in 1715, supplied three. Murray argued they had gone as far as possible and now risked being cut off by superior forces, with Cumberland advancing north from London, and Wade moving south from Newcastle. Charles admitted he had not heard from the English Jacobites since leaving France; this meant he lied when claiming otherwise and his relationship with the Scots was irretrievably damaged.

The Council voted overwhelmingly to retreat, a decision strengthened by a report received from Lord John Drummond that French ships had landed supplies and money at the port of Montrose, Angus. They included "volunteers" from the "Royal Écossais" and the Irish Brigade, units of the  regular French Royal Army. While these troops numbered less than 200 in total, Drummond allegedly suggested another 10,000 were preparing to follow, "greatly influencing" the decision.

While debated ever since, contemporaries did not believe the Hanoverian regime would collapse, even had the Jacobites reached London. The decision to retreat was driven by lack of English support or of a French landing in England, not proximity to the capital, and its wisdom supported by many modern historians. One reason was that their lack of heavy weapons allowed the Jacobites to out-march their opponents, but would be a disadvantage in a set piece battle. In a letter of 30 November, the Duke of Richmond, who was with Cumberland's army, listed five possible options for the Jacobites, of which retreating to Scotland was by far the best for them, and the worst for the government.

The British government was concerned by reports of an invasion fleet being prepared at Dunkirk but it is unclear how serious these plans were. Over the winter of 1745 to 1746, Maréchal Maurice de Saxe was assembling troops in Northern France in preparation for an offensive into Flanders, while Dunkirk was a major privateer base and always busy. Threatening an invasion was a far more cost-effective means of consuming British resources than actually doing so and these plans were formally cancelled in January 1746.

The retreat badly damaged the relationship between Charles and the Scots, both sides viewing the other with suspicion and hostility. Elcho later wrote that Murray believed they could have continued the war in Scotland "for several years", forcing the Crown to agree to terms as its troops were desperately needed for the war on the Continent. This seems unlikely since despite their victories in Flanders, in early 1746 Finance Minister Machault warned Louis that the British naval blockade had reduced the French economy to a 'catastrophic state'.

The fast-moving Jacobite army evaded pursuit with only a minor skirmish at Clifton Moor, crossing back into Scotland on 20 December. Cumberland's army arrived outside Carlisle on 22 December, and seven days later the garrison was forced to surrender, ending the Jacobite military presence in England. Much of the garrison came from the Manchester Regiment and several of the officers were later executed, including Francis Towneley.

Road to Culloden

The invasion itself achieved little, but reaching Derby and returning was a considerable military achievement. Morale was high, while reinforcements from Aberdeenshire and Banffshire under Lewis Gordon along with Scottish and Irish regulars in French service brought Jacobite strength to over 8,000. French-supplied artillery was used to besiege Stirling Castle, the strategic key to the Highlands. On 17 January, the Jacobites dispersed a relief force under Henry Hawley at the Battle of Falkirk Muir but the siege itself made little progress.

Hawley's forces were largely intact and advanced on Stirling again once Cumberland arrived in Edinburgh on 30 January, while many Highlanders had gone home after Falkirk; on 1 February, the siege was abandoned and the Jacobite main force retreated to Inverness. Cumberland's army advanced along the coast, allowing it to be resupplied by sea, and entered Aberdeen on 27 February; both sides halted operations until the weather improved.

A few French shipments evaded the Royal Navy's blockade but by spring, the Jacobites were short of both food and money to pay their men and when Cumberland left Aberdeen on 8 April, the leadership agreed giving battle was their best option. Arguments over the location stem from post-war disputes between supporters of Murray and O'Sullivan, largely responsible for selecting it, but defeat was a combination of factors. In addition to superior numbers and equipment, Cumberland's troops had been drilled in countering the Highland charge, which relied on speed and ferocity to break the enemy lines. When successful it resulted in quick victories like Prestonpans and Falkirk, but if it failed, they could not hold their ground.

The Battle of Culloden on 16 April, often cited as the last pitched battle on British soil, lasted less than an hour and ended in a decisive government victory. Exhausted by a night march carried out in a failed attempt to surprise Cumberland's troops, many Jacobites missed the battle, leaving fewer than 5,000 to face a well-rested and equipped force of 7,000 to 9,000.

Fighting began with an artillery exchange: that of the government was vastly superior in training and coordination, particularly as James Grant, an officer in the Irish Brigade who served as the Jacobite army's artillery colonel, was absent, having been wounded at Fort William. Charles held his position, expecting Cumberland to attack, but he refused to do so and unable to respond to the fire, Charles ordered his front line to charge. As they did so, boggy ground in front of the Jacobite centre forced them over to the right, where they became entangled with the right wing regiments and where movement was restricted by an enclosure wall.

This increased the distance to the government lines and slowed the momentum of the charge, lengthening their exposure to the government artillery, which now switched to grapeshot. Despite this, the Highlanders crashed into Cumberland's left, which gave ground but did not break, while Loudon's regiment fired into their flank from behind the wall. Unable to return fire, the Highlanders broke and fell back in confusion; the north-eastern regiments and Irish and Scots regulars in the second line retired in good order, allowing Charles and his personal retinue to escape northwards.

Troops that held together, like the French regulars, were far less vulnerable in retreat and many Highlanders were cut down by government dragoons in the pursuit. Government casualties are estimated as 50 killed, plus 259 wounded; many Jacobite wounded remaining on the battlefield were reportedly killed afterwards, their losses being 1,200 to 1,500 dead and 500 prisoners. A potential 5,000 to 6,000 Jacobites remained in arms and over the next two days, an estimated 1,500 survivors assembled at Ruthven Barracks; however on 20 April, Charles ordered them to disperse, arguing French assistance was required to continue the fight and they should return home until he returned with additional support.

Lord Elcho later claimed to have told Charles he should "put himself at the head of the [...] men that remained to him, and live and die with them," but he was determined to leave for France. After evading capture in the Western Highlands, Charles was picked up by a French ship commanded by Richard Warren on 20 September; he never returned to Scotland but the collapse of his relationship with the Scots always made this unlikely. Even before Derby, he accused Murray and others of treachery; these outbursts became more frequent due to disappointment and heavy drinking, while the Scots no longer trusted his promises of support.

Aftermath

After Culloden, government forces spent several weeks searching for rebels, confiscating cattle and burning non-juring Episcopalian and Catholic meeting houses. The brutality of these measures was partly driven by a widespread perception on both sides that another landing was imminent. Regular soldiers in French service were treated as prisoners of war and exchanged regardless of nationality, but 3,500 captured Jacobites were indicted for treason. Of these, 120 were executed, primarily deserters from government forces and members of the Manchester Regiment. Some 650 died awaiting trial, 900 were pardoned and the rest transported to the colonies.

The Jacobite lords Kilmarnock, Balmerino and Lovat were beheaded in April 1747, but public opinion was against further trials and the remaining prisoners were pardoned under the 1747 Act of Indemnity. They included Flora MacDonald, whose aristocratic admirers collected over £1,500 for her. Lord Elcho, Lord Murray and Lochiel were excluded from this and died in exile; Archibald Cameron, responsible for recruiting the Cameron regiment in 1745, was allegedly betrayed by his own clansmen on returning to Scotland and executed on 7 June 1753.

The government limited confiscations of Jacobite property, since the experience of doing so after 1715 and 1719 showed the cost often exceeded the sales price. Under the 1747 Vesting Act, the estates of 51 attainted for their role in 1745 were surveyed by the Court of Exchequer, and 41 forfeited. The majority of these were either purchased or claimed by creditors, with 13 made crown land in 1755. Under the 1784 Disannexing Act, their heirs were allowed to buy them back, in return for a total payment of £65,000.

Once north of Edinburgh or inland from ports like Aberdeen, the movement of government troops was hampered by lack of roads or accurate maps of the Highlands. To remedy this, new forts were built, the military road network started by Wade finally completed and William Roy made the first comprehensive survey of the Highlands. Additional measures were taken to weaken the traditional clan system, which even before 1745 had been under severe stress due to changing economic conditions. The most significant was the Heritable Jurisdictions (Scotland) Act 1746, which ended the feudal power of chiefs over their clansmen. The Act of Proscription outlawed Highland dress unless worn in military service, although its impact is debated and the law was repealed in 1782.

The Jacobite cause did not entirely disappear after 1746, but the conflicting objectives of its participants ended the movement as a serious political threat. Many Scots were disillusioned by Charles' leadership while the decline in English Jacobitism was demonstrated by the lack of support from areas strongly Jacobite in 1715, such as Northumberland and County Durham. Irish Jacobite societies increasingly reflected opposition to the existing order rather than affection for the Stuarts and were eventually absorbed by the Society of United Irishmen.

In June 1747, D’Éguilles produced a report on the Rising that was critical of the Jacobite leadership in general, while his opinion of Charles was so negative that he concluded France might be better served by supporting a Scottish Republic. Soon after this, Henry Benedict Stuart was ordained as a Roman Catholic priest; Charles viewed this as tacit acceptance that the Stuart cause was finished and never forgave him. For both leaders, the Rebellion was to be the highlight of their careers. Charles was forcibly deported from France after the 1748 Treaty of Aix-la-Chapelle and rapidly descended into alcoholism, while Cumberland resigned from the British Army in 1757 and died of a stroke in 1765.

Charles continued his attempts to reignite the cause, including making a secret visit to London in 1750, when he met supporters and briefly converted to the Non-Juring Anglican Communion. In 1759, he met to discuss another invasion with Choiseul, then Chief minister of France, but the latter dismissed him as incapable through drink. Despite Charles's urgings, Pope Clement XIII refused to recognise him as Charles III after their father died in 1766. He died of a stroke in Rome in January 1788, a disappointed and embittered man.

Legacy

Writing in the mid-20th century, Scottish historian Winifred Duke claimed "...the accepted idea of the Forty-Five in the minds of most people is a hazy and picturesque combination of a picnic and a crusade ... in cold reality, Charles was unwanted and unwelcomed." Modern commentators argue the focus on "Bonnie Prince Charlie" obscures the fact that many of those who participated in the Rising did so because they opposed the Union, not the Hanoverians, a nationalist aspect making it part of an ongoing political idea, rather than the last act of a doomed Highland cause and culture. One example of how this influenced historical perspectives is the tendency to portray the Jacobite Army as composed largely of Gaelic-speaking Highlanders. As recently as 2013, the Culloden Visitors Centre listed Lowland regiments such as Lord Elcho's and Balmerino's Life Guards, Baggot's Hussars and Viscount Strathallan's Perthshire Horse as "Highland Horse". Although a significant proportion were Highlanders, the army included many Lowland units, limited numbers of English, and several hundred French and Irish regulars.

After 1745, the popular perception of Highlanders changed from that of "wyld, wykkd Helandmen", who were racially and culturally distinct from other Scots, to members of a noble warrior race. For a century before 1745, rural poverty drove increasing numbers to enlist in foreign armies, such as the Dutch Scots Brigade, but while many Highlanders had military experience, the military aspects of clanship had been in decline for many years, the last significant inter-clan battle being Maol Ruadh in August 1688. Foreign service was banned in 1745 and recruitment into the British Army accelerated as deliberate policy. Victorian imperial administrators accentuated this by recruiting from the so-called "martial races", with Highlanders, Sikhs, Dogras and Gurkhas being grouped together as those who were arbitrarily identified as sharing military virtues.

Before 1707, Scots writers were part of a wider and often uniform European literary culture. The creation of a uniquely Scottish style began as a reaction to Union, with poets like Allan Ramsay using Scots vernacular for the first time. After the Rising, reconciling the Jacobite past with a Unionist present meant focusing on a shared cultural identity, made easier by the fact it did not imply sympathy for the Stuarts; Ramsay was one of those who left Edinburgh when it fell to the Jacobites in 1745. However, the study of Scottish history itself was largely ignored by schools and universities until the mid-20th century.

The vernacular style was continued after 1745, most famously by Robert Burns but others avoided recent divisions within Scottish society by looking back to a far more distant and largely mythical past. These included James Macpherson, who between 1760 and 1765 published the Ossian cycle which was a best-seller throughout Europe. The claim that it was a translation from the original Gaelic has been disputed ever since but the post-1746 sense of a culture under threat led to an upsurge in Scottish Gaelic literature, much of it related to the events of the Rising. Alasdair mac Mhaighstir Alasdair, generally credited as author of the first secular works in Gaelic in the early 1740s, was followed by Gaelic poets including Donnchadh Bàn Mac an t-Saoir, who participated in the Rising as part of a government militia, and Catriona Nic Fhearghais, who allegedly lost her husband at Culloden.

The Rising has been a popular topic for writers such as D. K. Broster and Sir Walter Scott, whose 1814 novel Waverley presented it as part of a shared Unionist history. The hero of Waverley is an Englishman who fights for the Stuarts, rescues a Hanoverian Colonel and finally rejects a romantic Highland beauty for the daughter of a Lowland aristocrat. Scott's reconciliation of Unionism and the '45 allowed Cumberland's nephew George IV to be painted less than 70 years later wearing Highland dress and tartans, previously symbols of Jacobite rebellion.

Replacing a complex and divisive historical past with a simplified but shared cultural tradition led to the Victorian inventions of Burns Suppers, Highland Games, tartans and the adoption by a largely Protestant nation of the Catholic icons Mary, Queen of Scots and Bonnie Prince Charlie. These continue to shape modern perspectives on the Scots past.

Notes

References

Sources

 
 
 
 
 
 
 
 
 
 
 
 
 
 
 
 
 
 
 
 
 
 

 
 
 
 
 
 
 
 
 
 
 
 
 
 
 
 
 
 
 
 
 
 
 
 
 
 
 
 
 
 
 
 
 
 
 
 
 
 
 
 
 
 
 
 
 
 
 
 
 

External links
1745 Rebellion on the UK Parliament website
 The Jacobite Rebellion, BBC Radio 4 discussion with Murray Pittock, Stana Nenadic & Allan Macinnes (In Our Time'', May 8, 2003)

 
1745 in Great Britain
1746 in Great Britain
Invasions of England